The Maly Ashap is a river in Perm Krai, Russia, a left tributary of the Iren, which in turn is a tributary of the Sylva.

References 

Rivers of Perm Krai